Halocarpus biformis, known commonly as yellow pine or pink pine, is a coniferous tree endemic to New Zealand. The tree can attain heights of 10 m (33 ft), but is usually a low-spreading bush in open areas. It is found at higher elevations in the volcanic plateau of the North Island and at lower elevations of the South Island and Stewart Island. It yields a tight-grained, sweet-smelling, and extremely durable wood. The species was formerly known as Dacrydium biforme.

References

Further reading
 Pink pine, yellow pine, Halocarpus biforme, New Zealand Plants, the University of Auckland

Podocarpaceae
Flora of the South Island
Flora of the North Island
Trees of New Zealand
Least concern plants